The Francis Haley House is a historic home in Cumberland, Allegany County, Maryland, United States. The house is an Italianate-influenced -story, brick structure built about 1870.  It was erected as the residence of a brick manufacturer, Francis Haley.

The Francis Haley House is a good example of mid-19th-century middle-class domestic architecture, with Italianate elements, in Cumberland. Throughout various eras in American history, middle-class house builders across the country adapted elements from popular 19th-century architectural styles, such as the Italianate, Gothic and Victorian. These styles were applied with a more limited range of features to homes for the middle-class in a way that was less expensive, yet indicated the modernity of the house and its occupants. The Haley House is typical of this type of house form in Cumberland, and provides a contrast to the city's elaborate upper-class Italianate houses, such as those within the Washington Street Historic District.

The Haley House was built around 1870 for successful local brick manufacturer Francis Haley. Haley was active in the brick trade from the 1840s until his death in the early 1880s. In 1875, he was appointed a member of the committee for building a new city hall. Haley was partially responsible for the construction of the surrounding Rolling Mill neighborhood, where his extensive brick yards were located, along with industrial B&O Railroad operations for which the neighborhood was named. With the growth of the railroad, Rolling Mill rapidly expanded. The Haley House was one of the neighborhood's most elaborate homes. His appropriately brick house has been altered very little since Haley's occupancy, and still consist of two perpendicular rectangular blocks with low gabled roofs that are supported by brackets. The windows in the gable end feature rounded arches and the interior details are simple, yet massive. A portion of the original iron fence manufactured in Ohio, still separates the house from the street.

The Francis Haley House was listed on the National Register of Historic Places in 1972.  It is located in the Rolling Mill Historic District.

References

External links
, including photo from 1979, at Maryland Historical Trust

Houses on the National Register of Historic Places in Maryland
Buildings and structures in Cumberland, Maryland
Italianate architecture in Maryland
Houses completed in 1870
Houses in Allegany County, Maryland
Individually listed contributing properties to historic districts on the National Register in Maryland
National Register of Historic Places in Allegany County, Maryland
Historic district contributing properties in Maryland